Bacha Khan Medical Complex Swabi (BKMCS) is a medical facility located in the Shahmansoor of Swabi District in the Khyber Pakhtunkhwa province of Pakistan. The hospital is named after the Pashtun leader and political figure, Bacha Khan.

The complex offers medical services including emergency care, inpatient and outpatient care, diagnostic services, and specialized treatments such as surgery, cardiology, and neurology.

It also serves as a training center for medical students and residents, in partnership with local universities and medical schools.

References

External links
 - official website

Hospitals in Khyber Pakthunkhwa
Swabi District